Events in the year 1843 in Norway.

Incumbents
Monarch: Charles III John

Events
14 September – 2/3 of the town of Egersund burns down.

Arts and literature

Births
5 January – Jørgen Christian Knudsen, ship-owner and politician (b.1922)
8 January – Johan Jeremiassen, ship-owner, consul and politician (d.1889)
2 February – Knute Nelson, Governor of Minnesota from 1893 till 1895 and United States Senator from Minnesota from 1895 till 1923. (d. 1923)
9 April – Canute R. Matson, Norwegian American Sheriff of Cook County, Illinois at the time of the Haymarket Square Riot  (d. 1903)
15 June – Edvard Grieg, composer and pianist (d.1907)
18 August – Johan Henrik Paasche Thorne, businessperson and politician (d.1920)
4 October – Christopher Knudsen, priest, politician and Minister (d.1915)
8 October – Kitty Lange Kielland, painter (d.1914)
31 October – Oscar Nissen, physician, newspaper editor and politician (d.1911)

Full date unknown
Axel Gudbrand Blytt, botanist (d.1898)
Yngvar Nielsen, historian and geographer (d.1916)
Herman Johan Foss Reimers, politician and Minister (d.1928)
Theodor Løvstad, musician, magazine editor (d.1913).

Deaths

17 March – Lars Andreas Oftedahl, priest and politician (b.1781)
13 June – Ole Edvard Buck, politician (b.1799)

Full date unknown
Mensen Ernst, road runner and ultramarathoner (b.1795)

See also

References